Lonnavale is a rural locality in the local government area (LGA) of Huon Valley in the South-east LGA region of Tasmania. The 2016 census recorded a population of 92 for the state suburb of Lonnavale.

History 
Lonnavale was gazetted as a locality in 1976. “Lonna” is believed to be an Aboriginal word meaning “windpipe and stone”.

Geography
The Huon River forms the south-eastern boundary.

Road infrastructure 
Route C619 (Glen Huon Road) passes to the east. From there, Lonnavale Road provides access to the locality.

References

Towns in Tasmania
Localities of Huon Valley Council